Twisted Colossus is a steel roller coaster located at Six Flags Magic Mountain in Valencia, California. Originally designed and built by International Amusement Devices, the roller coaster opened as Colossus, a dual-tracked roller coaster, on June 29, 1978. Colossus became well known after appearances in film and television, including the box-office hit National Lampoon's Vacation and the made-for-TV movie Kiss Meets the Phantom of the Park. For 19 years, it was the park's main attraction until the opening of Superman: The Escape.

After more than 36 years in operation, Six Flags closed Colossus on August 16, 2014. Rocky Mountain Construction renovated the ride converting its wooden track to steel, allowing for the addition of inversions and steep drops. It retained much of its wooden structure, however, and reemerged as Twisted Colossus on May 23, 2015.

History

For its next attraction to debut in 1978, Magic Mountain wanted a wooden roller coaster for the classic "rumble and sway" experience that they felt was missing from steel coasters. They hired Ohio-based International Amusement Devices (IAD), who began designing Colossus in January 1977. IAD in turn subcontracted Bernard Brothers Construction for the construction of the ride, Continental Consultants for all of the mechanical systems, and Lorenz & Williams for the structural engineering and electronic systems. A member of the design team traveled to Mexico City to study Montaña Rusa – the largest wooden roller coaster in the world at the time – in order to help plan for the project.

The design was finalized in May 1977, and construction began a few months later in August. During construction, a tornado caused part of the structure to collapse, but the roller coaster was still completed on schedule. At a final cost of $7 million, Colossus opened to the public on June 29, 1978.

Modifications
Colossus underwent a number of changes over the years. In 1979, the ride closed for approximately ten months to remove excessive negative g-forces. The speed hill after the second drop, the double-up element, and several of the ride's other hills were reprofiled. Also, the original IAD trains were replaced with trains manufactured by Philadelphia Toboggan Company (PTC) during this renovation. In 1987, the PTC trains were replaced with trains manufactured by Morgan Manufacturing, and the valley within the double-dip element was leveled off and received block brakes in 1991.

During the Halloween season, the coaster's web-like structure was accompanied by a giant black spider, and the height restriction became . On August 29, 2013, Six Flags Magic Mountain announced that they would run Colossus backwards for a limited time during the 2014 season. The train on one side of the track was changed to run backward using the old trains from the now defunct Psyclone roller coaster.

Closure and Twisted Colossus announcement

During the 2014 season Six Flags Magic Mountain announced that Colossus would close permanently on August 16, 2014. On August 4, 2014, the park held a 36-hour riding marathon event on the roller coaster as a way for the public to say goodbye to one of the park's staples. Out of 24 participants, six completed the marathon of 328 laps around the track in  intervals.

On September 8, 2014, Magic Mountain’s Colossus roller coaster catches fire. Less than two weeks after the ride closed, Six Flags announced that Colossus would reopen in 2015 as Twisted Colossus following a renovation by Rocky Mountain Construction. The company added their patented I-Box track technology to the ride, also known as Iron Horse, which converts the wooden track to steel while retaining some to most of the original wooden structure.

In late 2018, the trains were updated with zipper pouches and modified lap bars.

Characteristics
The table below summarizes the differences between Colossus and Twisted Colossus. With the exception of capacity, the statistics of Colossus represent a single track only.

Ride experience

Colossus
Its original configuration was noted for numerous and sustained air-time moments, which were eventually toned down or eliminated by reprofiling and/or braking.

Twisted Colossus

The ride begins on the blue track, boarding from what was the right side track's station. Immediately after dispatch, the ride makes a 90 degree left turn, is sent through a set of drive tires to boost the train towards the pre-lift section, and makes another left turn. After going through a series of small hills in the pre-lift, the train makes its way up the right side of the lift hill, catching up to the train on the green track.  Immediately after the lift hill ends, riders are sent down an 80 degree, 128 foot drop.  The trains then go through a small airtime hill and then up another tall hill, crossing under Goliath.  The train then proceeds to go through a banked turn to the left, and goes through a "high-five" element.  After this, the blue tracked train drops down and goes under the train on the green track while it does its top gun stall. The blue track goes through an airtime hill, taking riders close to the train in the green track's stall. Then the blue tracked train does a zero-g roll.  After a double up and a quick turn to the left, the blue track turns green and the train hits a brake run, before returning to the left side of the lift hill.  The green track is identical to the blue tracked segment up through the high-five, which is banked in the opposite direction as to create the "high-five" illusion with the blue track. After the high-five, the green track does a double down and does a top gun stall crossing over the blue track. After crossing under the blue track's zero-g roll, it then goes up a double up and turns left, where the train hits the final brake run.

Because Twisted Colossus is a "racing coaster" with one long continuous circuit, it may be considered a Möbius Loop roller coaster. However, unlike most Möbius Loop layouts, it only has one station and one cycle sends riders through both sides. This is different from a traditional Möbius Loop layout (such as Racer at Kennywood), which takes riders through only half of the ride's "complete" circuit before stopping and unloading at the other station.

Because of the unusual setup of a one-station Möbius Loop layout, to race, the operators on Twisted Colossus must properly time dispatches. While a train is in the blue side, the ride operators will sometimes call out " __ seconds to race", counting down to encourage riders to board quickly so they can race. To give the ride operators extra time, the green lift can run slower than the blue lift, giving the blue side time to catch up.

Use in media
Colossus was nearing completion in May 1978 when it was used as a backdrop for fight scenes in the NBC TV movie Kiss Meets the Phantom of the Park. In 1983, it was featured in the film National Lampoon's Vacation as Screemy Meemy. In the sitcom Step by Step, Colossus is the roller coaster that the Lambert-Foster family rides in the opening sequence. The roller coaster was also seen in television episodes of Knight Rider, Wonder Woman, and The A-Team. The film Zapped! featured the ride when protagonists Barney and Bernadette visit Magic Land (Six Flags Magic Mountain). The Castle episode "Deep Cover" used Colossus as a stand-in for the Coney Island Cyclone.

In 1993 it was used in the My Life (film) as the Serpent. 

The track "Colossus" on Tyler, the Creator's album Wolf is named after the coaster.

In 2021, the movie Yes Day, uses Twisted Colossus for a movie scene where Alison Torres rides it with her daughter.

Incidents
A 20-year-old woman died after being thrown from the ride in December 1978. An investigation determined the lap bar restraint was in working condition, but they speculated that the rider's size may have made the restraint ineffective.

On September 8, 2014, while workers were disassembling the track, the top of the lift hill on Colossus caught on fire. The fire – which occurred while the park was closed – was contained and no injuries were reported.

On July 7, 2022, an 8-year-old girl was wounded in the head when a mobile phone struck her while she was riding the roller coaster.

Awards
Twisted Colossus ranked in the Amusement Today's Golden Ticket Awards for best new ride of 2015 with 13% of the vote, coming in third place.

References

External links

 
 
 Twisted Colossus at Rocky Mountain Construction

Roller coasters in California
Hybrid roller coasters
Roller coasters manufactured by Rocky Mountain Construction
Roller coasters operated by Six Flags
Six Flags Magic Mountain
Steel roller coasters
Roller coasters introduced in 2015